Guidel is a commune in the Morbihan department of Brittany in north-western France. Inhabitants of Guidel are called in French Guidélois.

Population

Cemetery
The communal cemetery, containing 108 tombs from the World War II, has been listed by the Commonwealth War Graves Commission. Most of the casualties were belonging to the Royal Air Force, Royal Canadian Air Force, Royal Australian Air Force and Royal New Zealand Air Force.

Breton language
The municipality launched a linguistic plan through Ya d'ar brezhoneg on 27 March 2007.

In 2008, there was 6,44% of the children attended the bilingual schools in primary education.

See also
Communes of the Morbihan department
Hortense Clémentine Tanvet Sculptor of war memorial

References

External links

Official site 

 Mayors of Morbihan Association 

Communes of Morbihan